was a Japanese former freestyle swimmer who won two medals at the 1936 Summer Olympics.

Uto endured much hardship after World War II and deposited both his medals to a pawnshop to get some money for living. He later found a job in general affairs at the Niigata Nippo company. After retiring he moved to Chiba Prefecture to do agriculture.

References

External links

1918 births
Possibly living people
Japanese male freestyle swimmers
Olympic bronze medalists for Japan
Olympic silver medalists for Japan
Olympic swimmers of Japan
Swimmers at the 1936 Summer Olympics
Sportspeople from Shizuoka Prefecture
People from Kakegawa, Shizuoka
Rikkyo University alumni
Olympic bronze medalists in swimming
Medalists at the 1936 Summer Olympics
Olympic silver medalists in swimming
20th-century Japanese people